Marcos José Olsen (born 30 October 1937) is a Brazilian former sports shooter. He competed at the 1972, 1976, 1984 and the 1984 Summer Olympics.

References

External links
 

1937 births
Living people
Brazilian male sport shooters
Olympic shooters of Brazil
Shooters at the 1972 Summer Olympics
Shooters at the 1976 Summer Olympics
Shooters at the 1980 Summer Olympics
Shooters at the 1984 Summer Olympics
Sportspeople from Santa Catarina (state)
Pan American Games medalists in shooting
Pan American Games silver medalists for Brazil
Pan American Games bronze medalists for Brazil
Shooters at the 1975 Pan American Games
Shooters at the 1979 Pan American Games
Shooters at the 1983 Pan American Games
Shooters at the 1987 Pan American Games
21st-century Brazilian people
20th-century Brazilian people

Brazilian people of Norwegian descent